Erhan Emre (born 4 September 1978) is a Turkish–German actor, director, film producer and writer.

Filmography

Television

Director

Producer

Personal life
Emre was born to kurdish immigrants in Germany, he is one of eight children.

References

External links

1978 births
German people of Turkish descent
German male television actors
Living people
Male actors from Berlin
German male film actors